Natungram Wooden Dolls are a type of wooden doll, popular in India, especially in the Bardhaman district of West Bengal state. The art of making wooden dolls is an age-old practice in India and Natungram dolls are especially culturally relevant, associated directly with the goddess Lakshmi. Other examples of such dolls include the famous Gour-Nitai, Krishna dolls, and Royal couple dolls.

History

The artists of Natungram worked first in stone carving, with the patronage of the local Rajas of Bardhaman. However, after the fall of the Raj following the abolition of the Zamindari System in 1951, the craftsmen faced difficulties. Many left the stone carving industry and began crafting fine arts and wooden works - though numbers of carvers are declining again due to the inefficiency of wood carving in comparison to plastic and metal.

One of the common family names here is Sutradhar due to the surname's association with carpentry and woodcarving.

Construction
Dolls are frequently made out of Gamhar wood, Mango wood, or Shimul wood. Around 51 families living in West Bengal are involved in doll making. All members of the family are involved in the doll making process. Separate sets of work are earmarked for the artisan. The males are skilled in wood carving and women do the coloring. The dolls are first chiseled from a piece of seasoned wood cut to the required length. Then the face and attire are painted. 

With changing times and the influx of metal, plastic, and machine-made goods, traditional woodcraft as an art has largely disappeared. Previously, the art of making wooden dolls and toys was prevalent over many districts in West Bengal but now the craft has been kept alive in only in a few places.

References

Indian handicrafts
Indian dolls
Wooden dolls